Mark Kennedy (born 13 June 1967) is a Jamaican boxer. He competed in the men's lightweight event at the 1988 Summer Olympics.

References

External links
 

1967 births
Living people
Lightweight boxers
Jamaican male boxers
Competitors at the 1986 Central American and Caribbean Games
Central American and Caribbean Games bronze medalists for Jamaica
Olympic boxers of Jamaica
Boxers at the 1988 Summer Olympics
Place of birth missing (living people)
Central American and Caribbean Games medalists in boxing
20th-century Jamaican people